Madelene Maria Sagström (born 13 November 1992) is a Swedish professional golfer who plays on the U.S.-based LPGA Tour. She won the 2020 Gainbridge LPGA at Boca Rio and was runner-up at the 2021 Women's British Open.

Early life
Sagström grew up in a family who had a great interest in sports and was used to physical practice from a young age. Nine years old, Sagström begun learning golf with her parents at Enköping Golf Club, 74 kilometres north-east of Stockholm, Sweden, and she has continued to represent the club.

Amateur career
16 years old, she won the 2009 Swedish Junior Stroke-play Championship (for players up to 21) over 72 holes at Österåker Golf Club outside Stockholm, by seven strokes, scoring five under par on the last 36 holes.

In 2011, Sagström won the French International Lady Junior Championship, at Golf de Saint Cloud outside Paris, and was a member of the winning Swedish team at the European Ladies' Team Championship at Golf Club Murhof in Austria.

Sagström played college golf with the LSU Lady Tigers team at Louisiana State University in Baton Rouge, Louisiana. She was 2015 SEC Player of the Year at LSU and a finalist for the ANNIKA Award.

Professional career
Sagström made her professional debut at the 2015 Helsingborg Open on the Ladies European Tour in Sweden in September and earned her first pay-check.

In 2016, Swedish former European Tour Order of Merit-winner Robert Karlsson became her mentor.

She joined the Symetra Tour in United States in 2016, where she finished inside the top-5 in her first five starts. After victories at both the Chico Patty Berg Memorial in Fort Myers, Florida, and the Self Regional Healthcare Foundation Classic in Greenwood, South Carolina, Sagström led the tour's money list race with a wide margin, meaning she all but sealed her spot in the LPGA 2017 rookie class.

With her third win at the Murphy USA El Dorado Shootout in El Dorado, Arkansas, Sagström both secured the top spot on the final Volvik Race for the Card money list and earned a "Battlefield Promotion" to the 2016 LPGA Tour. She had a record breaking Symetra Tour season, becoming the first player in Tour history to crack $100,000 and $150,000, winning Player of the Year and Rookie of the Year honors. In 14 Symetra Tour starts, Sagström had three wins and 11 top-10 finishes.

In December 2016, Sagström won the Ladies European Tour's Q-School in Morocco, securing membership of the Ladies European Tour for 2017, a requirement to make her eligible for selection in the 2017 Solheim Cup. She was selected as a captain's pick by Annika Sörenstam to 2017 European Solheim Cup team and finished the 2017 LPGA Tour season 49th on the Order of Merit.

She finished tied for second at the Pure Silk Championship on the LPGA Tour in May 2019.  

In her first tournament of the 2020 season, Sagström notched her first win on the LPGA Tour at the Gainbridge LPGA at Boca Rio played at Boca Rio Golf Club in Boca Raton, Florida. She finished with a one shot lead after making par on the final hole against Nasa Hataoka who made bogey. Sagström set the course record at Boca Rio firing a 62 (−10) in the second round of the tournament. Taking the 117th LPGA Tour win by a Swedish born player, Sagström became the 12th Swedish winner on the tour.

She qualified for one of the two Swedish spots at the 2021 Summer Olympics in Tokyo, Japan.

Two weeks after the Olympic golf tournament, Sagström tied the first round lead at the 2021 Women's British Open and eventually finished tied second, one shot behind winner Anna Nordqvist, after scoring a bogey on the final hole. After the tournament, she was announced as one of the captain's pick for the 2021 European Solheim Cup team. 

In 2022, Sagström recorded four consecutive top-10 finishes, including T3 at the DIO Implant LA Open and the Cognizant Founders Cup, to rise into the top-30 of the Women's World Golf Rankings for the first time. In the 2022 Women's British Open at Muirfield she shot a day-low 65 in round two to share second place with eventual winner Ashleigh Buhai. Sagström finished the tournament in shared fourth place, 3 strokes behind Buhai, after a final-hole bogey.

Amateur wins
2009 Swedish Junior Strokeplay Championship
2011 French International Lady Junior Championship

Professional wins (4)

LPGA Tour (1)

Symetra Tour (3)

Results in LPGA majors
Results not in chronological order before 2019.

CUT = missed the half-way cut
NT = no tournament
T = tied

Team appearances
Amateur
European Girls' Team Championship (representing Sweden): 2010
European Ladies' Team Championship (representing Sweden): 2011 (winners), 2013, 2014, 2015
Vagliano Trophy (representing the Continent of Europe): 2011 (winners), 2015 (winners)
Espirito Santo Trophy (representing Sweden): 2012, 2014

Professional
Solheim Cup (representing Europe): 2017, 2021 (winners)
International Crown (representing Sweden): 2018

Solheim Cup record

References

External links

Madelene Sagström at the Symetra Tour official site

Golfdata: Madelene Sagström

Swedish female golfers
LPGA Tour golfers
Ladies European Tour golfers
Solheim Cup competitors for Europe
Olympic golfers of Sweden
Golfers at the 2020 Summer Olympics
LSU Lady Tigers golfers
Sportspeople from Uppsala
1992 births
Living people